Mussel Creek is a small stream, about  long, in Curry County in the U.S. state of Oregon. It arises in the Siskiyou Mountains and flows generally west to its confluence with Myrtle Creek in the Arizona Beach State Recreation Site.

See also
List of rivers of Oregon

References

Rivers of Oregon
Rivers of Curry County, Oregon